The 2001–02 St. John's Red Storm men's basketball team represented St. John's University during the 2001–02 NCAA Division I men's basketball season. The team was coached by Mike Jarvis in his fourth year. St. John's home games are played at Carnesecca Arena, then called Alumni Hall, and Madison Square Garden and the team is a member of the Big East Conference.

Off season

Departures

Class of 2001 signees

Roster

Schedule and results

|-
!colspan=9 style="background:#FF0000; color:#FFFFFF;"| Exhibition

|-
!colspan=9 style="background:#FF0000; color:#FFFFFF;"| Non-conference regular season

|-
!colspan=9 style="background:#FF0000; color:#FFFFFF;"| Big East Conference regular season

|-
!colspan=9 style="background:#FF0000; color:#FFFFFF;"| Big East tournament

|-
!colspan=9 style="background:#FF0000; color:#FFFFFF;"| NCAA tournament

References

St. John's Red Storm men's basketball seasons
St. John's
St. John's
St John
St John